Mount Meenahga is a mountain located on the Shawangunk Ridge of New York southeast of Ellenville. The Shawangunk Ridge is located south, High Point is located northeast, and Bear Hill is located southwest of Mount Meenahga.

References

Mountains of Ulster County, New York
Mountains of New York (state)